Punjab University may refer to:

India
 Punjab Agricultural University, a state agricultural university in Ludhiana, Punjab
 I. K. Gujral Punjab Technical University, a State university in Jalandhar, Punjab
 Panjab University, a public collegiate university in Chandigarh
 Punjabi University, a higher education institute in Patiala, Punjab

Pakistan
 University of the Punjab or University of Punjab, a public research university in Lahore, Punjab
 University of the Punjab, Gujranwala, a public teaching and research university in Gujranwala, Punjab
University of Central Punjab, a private-sector university in Lahore, Punjab